Verticillium alfalfae is a fungus. It causes verticillium wilt in some plant species, particularly alfalfa. It produces yellow-pigmented hyphae and microsclerotia, while producing resting mycelium. It is most closely related to V. albo-atrum and V. nonalfalfae.

References

Further reading

Inderbitzin, Patrik, et al. "Identification and differentiation of Verticillium species and V. longisporum lineages by simplex and multiplex PCR assays." PLoS ONE8.6 (2013): e65990.
Stajner, Natasa. "Identification and Differentiation of Verticillium Species with PCR Markers and Sequencing of ITS Region." Plant and Animal Genome XXIII Conference. Plant and Animal Genome.
Inderbitzin, Patrik, and Krishna V. Subbarao. "Taxonomic challenges-molecular evidence for species and sub-specific groups in Verticillium." 11 th International Verticillium Symposium. 2013.

External links

MycoBank

Fungal plant pathogens and diseases
Hypocreales incertae sedis
Fungi described in 2011